Kunzea amathicola, also known by the Maori names manuka and rawiritoa,  is a flowering plant in the myrtle family, Myrtaceae and is endemic to New Zealand. It is a densely-branched, densely-foliaged large shrub or tree with sprays of large white flowers with a red centre.

Description
The branches are densely covered with silky hairs and the leaves are of two forms, juvenile and mature.

Taxonomy and naming
Kunzea amathicola was first formally described in 2014 by Peter James de Lange and Hellmut Toelken and the description was published in PhytoKeys. The specific epithet (amathicola) is derived from the Ancient Greek amathos meaning "sand" and the Latin -cola meaning "dweller" referring to the usual habitat of this species.

Distribution and habitat
This kunzea usually grows on sand dunes or in sandy soils in coastal and near-coastal areas on both the North and South Islands as well as the Little Barrier Island. In the North Island it is most common on the west coast between Wellington and Te Paki and in the South Island from Farewell Spit to West Whanganui Inlet.

Use in horticulture
Rawiritoa is most easily propagated from fresh seed and is fast-growing is a sunny position in well-drained soil.

References

amathicola
Endemic flora of New Zealand
Plants described in 2014
Taxa named by Peter James de Lange
Taxa named by Hellmut R. Toelken